Stella Rossa is a futsal club based in Vienna, Austria. The club was founded in 1998, played in the Murexin Futsal Bundesliga.

Squad players
 Milan Djuricic(Gk)
 Sinisa Kulic(Gk)
 Dalibor Kalajdzic(Gk)
 Josip Djoja
 Muhammed Ali Keskin
 Boris Vukovic
 Vaso Vojnovic
 David Rajkovic
 Robert Bencun
 Djordje Miletic
 Manuel Gager
 Jakov Josic
 Arhur Vozenilek
 Alec Flogel

Honours
 2 Leagues (2007, 2010)
 1 Cup (2008)

References
 uefa.com

External link
 Official website

Futsal clubs in Austria
Futsal clubs established in 1998
Sport in Vienna